The 2014 Central League Climax Series (CLCS) consisted of two consecutive series, Stage 1 being a best-of-three series and Stage 2 being a best-of-six with the top seed being awarded a one-win advantage. The winner of the series advanced to the 2014 Japan Series, where they competed against the 2014 Pacific League Climax Series (PLCS) winner. The top three regular-season finishers played in the two series. The CLCS began on with the first game of Stage 1 on October 11 and ended with the final game of Stage 2 on October 18.

First stage

Summary

Game 1

Game 2

Final stage

Summary

* The Central League regular season champion is given a one-game advantage in the Final Stage.

Game 1

Game 2

Game 3

Game 4

References

Climax Series
Central League Climax Series